Katja Blichfeld (born 1979) is an American writer, director, producer and casting director. She is known for co-creating and directing High Maintenance, a Vimeo web series and HBO television series. She won a Primetime Emmy award for Outstanding Casting on a Comedy Series for her work on 30 Rock.

Personal life
Born and raised in Long Beach, California, Blichfeld was raised by Danish parents as an evangelical Christian. She has also lived in Chicago and New York City.

In 2010 she married her writing partner and High Maintenance co-creator Ben Sinclair, after meeting at a 2009 party in Los Angeles. They came up with the idea for the show while on a bicycle ride across the Williamsburg Bridge, and started the show in 2012.

Blichfield and Sinclair divorced amicably in 2016, prior to undertaking Season 2 of High Maintenance.

At 37, she came out as a lesbian.

References

External links
 
 Katja Blichfeld – Tumblr blog

1979 births
Living people
American television directors
American women television directors
American television writers
American lesbian artists
LGBT television directors
American LGBT screenwriters
Showrunners
LGBT people from California
21st-century American screenwriters